Dr. Kotnis ki Amar Kahani is a 1946 Indian film in Hindustani as well as English, written by Khwaja Ahmad Abbas and directed by V. Shantaram. The English version was titled The Journey of Dr. Kotnis. Both versions starred Shantaram in the title role. The film is based on the life of Dwarkanath Kotnis, an Indian doctor who worked in China during the Japanese invasion in World War II. The film was screened in competition at the 1947 Venice Film Festival.

Overview

The film was based on the story "And One Did Not Come Back" by Khwaja Ahmad Abbas, which is itself based on the heroic life of Dr. Dwarkanath Kotnis, played by V. Shantaram in the film.

Dr. Kotnis was sent to China during the Second World War to provide medical assistance to the troops fighting against the Japanese invasion in Yenan province.

While in China he met and courted a Chinese girl, Gou Qinglan. He died of Epilepsy in China.

Cast

Lead cast:
 V.Shantaram as Dwarkanath Kotnis
 Jayashree Kamulkar as Gou Qinglan

Rest of the cast, listed alphabetically:
 Baburao Pendharkar as General Fong
 Jankidas as Dr. Mukerjee (as Janki Dass)
 Keshavrao Date as Dr. Kotnis' father
 Master Vinayak as Bundoo
 Pratima Devi as Dr. Kotnis' mother (as Pratimadevi)
 Prof. Hudlikar as Dr. Atal
 Rajshree as Dr. Kotnis' son
 Salvi as Dr. Cholkar
 Ulhas as Dr. Basu

Poster and artwork
The poster and artwork were designed and executed by the noted calendar artist S. M. Pandit through his studio S. M. Pandit.

References

External links
 
 Poster for Dr Kotnis ki Amar Kahani at the V&A exhibition Cinema India

1946 films
1946 drama films
1940s biographical drama films
Films scored by Vasant Desai
1940s Hindi-language films
1940s war drama films
English-language Indian films
Films directed by V. Shantaram
Films with screenplays by Khwaja Ahmad Abbas
Indian biographical drama films
Indian black-and-white films
Indian war drama films
Medical-themed films
Second Sino-Japanese War films
1940s Urdu-language films
World War II films based on actual events
Urdu-language Indian films